Alan Walker (born 17 December 1959) is an English former professional footballer. His clubs included Lincoln City, Millwall, and Plymouth Argyle. Walker's most notable time in the professional game was at Gillingham, where he made over 150 Football League appearances, was named Player of the Season in 1989–90, and was named in the PFA Division Four Team of the Year for 1991–92.

He has managed several non-league sides including Sittingbourne as player/manager, Tonbridge Angels, Fisher Athletic and Maidstone United. He is currently head of coaching at the Kent County Football Association.

Honours
Individual
PFA Team of the Year: 1991–92 Fourth Division

References

1959 births
Living people
People from Mossley
English footballers
Association football defenders
Mossley A.F.C. players
Stockport County F.C. players
Bangor City F.C. players
Telford United F.C. players
Lincoln City F.C. players
Millwall F.C. players
Gillingham F.C. players
Plymouth Argyle F.C. players
Mansfield Town F.C. players
Barnet F.C. players
Sittingbourne F.C. players
St. Leonards F.C. players
Maidstone United F.C. players
English football managers
Fisher Athletic F.C. managers
Tonbridge Angels F.C. managers
Maidstone United F.C. managers